Lebo or LEBO may refer to
 Lebo, Kansas, a small town in Kansas, United States
 Lebo High School in Kansas
 Lebo-Waverly USD 243, a school district in Kansas
 Lebo, Missouri, an unincorporated community
 Lebo Formation, a geological formation in Montana, United States
 A short version of the South African given name Lebogang
 Lebo (surname)
 David Le Batard (LEBO), Cuban-American cartoon artist
 A derogatory ethnic slur for a person from Lebanon, especially a Lebanese Australian